A by-election was held in the New South Wales state electoral district of Upper Hunter on 8 June 1918. The by-election was triggered by the resignation of Mac Abbott.

Dates

Results

Mac Abbott resigned.

See also
Electoral results for the district of Upper Hunter
List of New South Wales state by-elections

References

New South Wales state by-elections
1918 elections in Australia
1910s in New South Wales